Ashley Adam Birks (born 19 October 1990) in Sheffield, South Yorkshire, England is a former speedway rider in the United Kingdom, who rode with the Scunthorpe Scorpions in the Premier League and Swindon Robins in the Elite League.
A former motocross rider, Birks chose to take up speedway when serious injuries brought his motocross career to a premature end. In 2010, Birks signed for Scunthorpe Saints in the National League.
After a successful first year in Speedway, Birks then signed for the Sheffield Tigers in the Premier League for the 2011 season.

During the 2012 National League speedway season he won the National League Riders' Championship.

References

1990 births
Living people
British speedway riders
Sheffield Tigers riders
Scunthorpe Scorpions riders
Swindon Robins riders